Shangfang Mountain is a small mountain located in southwest of Suzhou near Shihu Lake. It's also a part of Shangfang Mountain National Forest Park. It is famous for Wu and Yue ruins.

References 

Mountains of Suzhou
Parks in Suzhou